The 1912 Yukon general election was held on April 29 to elect the ten members of the Yukon Territorial Council. The council was non-partisan and had merely an advisory role to the federally appointed Commissioner.

Members elected
Bonanza - Duncan Robertson, George Williams
Klondike - Eugene Hogan, Archie Martin
North Dawson - Charles William Tabor, Alarie Seguin
South Dawson - A.J. Gillis, Isaac Lusk
Whitehorse - Patrick Martin, Willard "Deacon" Phelps

Seguin and Lusk resigned their seats in 1914, and were succeeded in by-elections by Frederick Pearce in North Dawson and Donald McLennan in South Dawson.

References

1912
1912 elections in Canada
Election
April 1912 events